Kolfe Keranio (Amharic: ኮልፌ ቀራኒዮ ክፍለ ከተማ), also spelled Kolfe Keraneo or simply Kolfe, is a district of Addis Ababa, Ethiopia. As of 2011 its population was of 546,219.

Geography
The district is located in the western suburb of the city, near the Gefersa Reservoir. It borders with the districts of Gullele, Addis Ketema, Lideta and Nifas Silk-Lafto.

List of places
 Jemo 2
 Mickey Ieland Condo Site
 Repi Upper

Admin Level: 11
 Asko Area
 Asko Bercheko Faberika Area 
 Atena Tera
 Ayer Tena
 Gebre Kirstos Bete Kristian
 Kolfe Keranio
 Koshim
 Kurtume Stream
 Lekwuanda
 Lideta Gebriel Bete Kristian
 Nefro Neighborhood
 Sost Kuter Mazoria (Total)
 Zenebework

References

External links

Districts of Addis Ababa